James Morris Easterly (born February 17, 1953) is a retired pitcher who played in the major leagues for the Atlanta Braves (1974–79), Milwaukee Brewers (1981–83) and Cleveland Indians (1983–87).

On June 30, 1978, he gave up Willie McCovey's 500th home run.

Easterly was a member of the Brewers' 1981 American League Eastern Division (2nd half) and 1982 AL pennant winning teams. He was traded along with Gorman Thomas and Ernie Camacho from the Brewers to the Indians for Rick Manning and Rick Waits on June 6, 1983.

He was released by the Cleveland Indians following the 1987 season, at which point he announced his retirement.

References

Sources

1953 births
Living people
Atlanta Braves players
Baseball players from Houston
Buffalo Bisons (minor league) players
Cleveland Indians players
Denver Bears players
Greenwood Braves players
Major League Baseball pitchers
Milwaukee Brewers players
Navegantes del Magallanes players
American expatriate baseball players in Venezuela
Orlando Juice players
Richmond Braves players
Savannah Braves players